Dorothée Duntze is a French-born illustrator of fairy tales.

Duntze was born in September 1960 in Reims, France.

Works
Goodbye Little Bird (c. 1983) by Damjan Mischa and translated by Anthea Bell
The Princess and the Pea (c. 1985) by Hans Christian Andersen
Little Daylight (1987) by George MacDonald
The Golden Goose (c. 1989) adapted by Anthea Bell from original by Jacob and Wilhelm Grimm
The Twelve Dancing Princesses (1995) translated by Anthea Bell from original by Jacob and Wilhelm Grimm
The Six Swans translated by Anthea Bell from original by Jacob and Wilhelm Grimm
Hansel and Gretel (2001) translated by Anthea Bell from original by Jacob and Wilhelm Grimm
Rapunzel (2005) translated by Anthea Bell from original by Jacob and Wilhelm Grimm

References

French women illustrators
1960 births
Artists from Reims
Living people
20th-century French women artists
20th-century French illustrators
20th-century illustrators of fairy tales
21st-century illustrators of fairy tales